Rebecca Brown Burton (born February 14, 1940, in Salt Lake City, Utah, United States) is a popular United States writer of over 75 romance novels under her married name Rebecca Burton, under her complete name Rebecca Brown Burton, and as Rebecca Winters for Harlequin Enterprises Ltd.

Biography
Born on February 14, 1940, in Salt Lake City, Utah, U.S. Burton is the daughter of Dr. John Zimmerman Brown, Jr. and Kathryn Ormsby Hyde. She studied in Lausanne, Switzerland. She is mother of four, Wilford, John, Dominique Jessop and Maxim, and lives in Salt Lake City, Utah.

Bibliography

As Rebecca Burton

Single novels
By Love Divided (1978)
The Loving Season (1979)

As Rebecca Brown Burton

Single novels
To Love Again (1987)

As Rebecca Winters

Single novels
Fully Involved (1990)
The Story Princess (1990)
Rites of Love (1991)
Blackie's Woman (1991)
Rescued Heart (1991)
The Marriage Bracelet (1992)
Both of Them (1992)
Meant for Each Other (1992)
Hero on the Loose (1993)
The Nutcracker Prince (1994)
The Baby Business (1995)
A Man for All Time (1995)
Return to Sender (1995)
The Wrong Twin (1995)
The Badlands Bride (1996)
Not Without My Child (1996)
Second – Best Wife (1996)
Three Little Miracles (1996)
Kit and the Cowboy (1996)
Undercover Husband (1997)
No Wife Required! (1997)
Bride by Day (1997)
Baby in a Million (1998)
If He Could See Me Now (1999)
Husband Potential (1999)
The Faithful Bride (2000)
The Unknown Sister (2000)
Brides and Grooms (2000)
Husband for a Year (2001) translate on Russian as "Жена для президента" ("Wife for president") famous Russian writer Valery Terekhin in 2003 and published in "Raduga"
The Toddler's Tale (2001)
Claiming His Baby (2001)
The Forbidden Marriage (2001)
The Bridegroom's Vow (2001)
Italian Weddings (2001)
The Baby Dilemma (2002)
The Tycoon's Proposition (2002)
Manhattan Merger (2003)
The Frenchman's Bride (2003)
Rafael's Convenient Proposal (2004)
The Baby Proposal (2004)
Husband by Request (2005)
Their New-Found Family (2005)
Father by Choice (2005)
Having the Frenchman's Baby (2006)
Meant-to-Be Marriage (2006)
The Bride of Montefalco (2006)
Matrimony with His Majesty (2007)
The Lazaridis Marriage (2007)
The Duke's Baby (2007)

The Nevada Men series
The Rancher and the Redhead (1993)
The Mermaid Wife (1994)
Bride of My Heart (1994)

The Mediterranean Dads series
The Italian Tycoon and the Nanny (2008)
The Italian Playboy's Secret Son (2008)

Strangers series
Strangers When We Meet (1997)
Laura's Baby (1997)

Taylor Family series
Until There Was You (1998)
Deborah's Son (1998)

Undercover Love series
Undercover Baby (1999)
Undercover Bachelor (1999)
Undercover Fiancee (1999)

Bachelor Dads & Babies
The Billionaire and the Baby (2000)
His Very Own Baby (2000)
The Baby Discovery (2000)

Count on a Cop series
Accidentally Yours (2001)
My Private Detective (2001)
Beneath a Texas Sky (2002)
She's My Mom (2002)

Twin Brides series
Bride Fit for a Prince (2002)
Rush to the Altar (2003)

Hawkins series
Another Man's Wife (2003)
Home to Copper Mountain (2003)

Single Father series
Woman in Hiding (2004)
To Be a Mother (2004)

The Husband Fund Series
To Catch a Groom (2004)
To Win His Heart (2004)
To Marry for Duty (2004)

Lost & Found Daughter series
The Daughter's Return (2005)
Somebody's Daughter (2006)

Omnibus in collaboration
Blind to Love (1988) (with Connie Bennett and Emma Goldrick)
Just Married (1993) (with Sandra Canfield, Muriel Jensen and Elise Title)
Marry Me Again (1994) (with Michelle Reid) (Lost in Love / Fully Involved)
Christmas Miracles (1996) (with Carole Mortimer and Betty Neels)
Daddy For Christmas (1998) (with Pamela Browning and Jule McBride)
Mistletoe Magic (1999) (with Betty Neels and Margaret Way)
Amnesia (2000) (with Sandra Marton and Lee Wilkinson)
Switched at the Altar (2001) (with Miranda Lee, Leigh Michaels and Susan Napier)
Family Matters (2001) (with Sherry Lewis)
His Majesty's Marriage (2002) (with Lucy Gordon) (The Prince's Choice / The King's Bride)
A Child for Christmas (2003) (with Carole Mortimer and Jennifer Taylor)
Coming Home for Christmas (2003) (with Helen Bianchin and Lucy Gordon)
Coming Home (2004) (with Helen Bianchin and Lucy Gordon)
Chocolate Fantasy / Frenchman's Bride (2004) (with Meryl Sawyer)
All in a Day (2005) (with Jessica Hart and Carole Mortimer)
Here Comes the Bride (2005) (with Jessica Hart)
After the Midnight Hour / Truth or Consequences / Bachelor at Risk (2005) (with Diana Duncan and Linda Randall Wisdom)
Christmas Proposals (2006) (with Marion Lennox and Carole Mortimer)
To Mum, with Love (2006) (with Margaret Way)
City Heat (2007) (with Helen Brooks and Catherine George)
Bound by a Baby (2007) (with Catherine Spencer and Kate Walker)

External links
Rebecca Winters official website
Rebecca Winters at eHarlequin
Rebecca Winters at Mills & Boon
Rebecca Winters's webpage at Fantastic Fiction's website

1940 births
20th-century American novelists
21st-century American novelists
American romantic fiction writers
Living people
American women novelists
Women romantic fiction writers
20th-century American women writers
21st-century American women writers
American expatriates in Switzerland
Writers from Salt Lake City
Novelists from Utah